Kala Suri Thangamma Appakutty (7 January 1925 – 15 June 2008) was a Sri Lankan philanthropist, veteran religious personality, educator and social activist. She is recognised for her notable works on Saivism and was regarded as one of the main pillars in developing Hinduism in Sri Lanka.

Career 
Thangamma had her primary education at Ramanathan College, Chunakam. She became a well trained teacher in 1945 and served as a teacher at the Union College, Tellippalai for 12 years. She continued her teaching for nearly 31 years before calling her time in 1976. She pursued her career mainly in charity and religious works after her retirement from teaching. She conducted lectures on the importance of Saivism and also helped to renovate and establish temples including the Tellippalai Durga Kovil. Thangamma became a pundit in Tamil and Saivism in 1952.

She was also well known for her social work during the Sri Lankan Civil War where she helped several women and children who were terribly affected. She was also instrumental in the development of Education in Jaffna by helping to construct libraries and schools.

Recognition 
The University of Jaffna honored her with an honorary doctorate degree in 1998 for her contributions in the development of education in Jaffna. The Government of Sri Lanka honored her with the prestigious title Kala Suri in 1991 recognising her services towards the society.

Death 
Appakutty died at the age of 83 on 15 June 2008 due to illness.

References 

1925 births
2008 deaths
Kala Suri
People from Jaffna District
Sri Lankan Hindus
Sri Lankan philanthropists
Sri Lankan Tamil activists
Sri Lankan Tamil teachers
Sri Lankan Tamil women
20th-century philanthropists